Hess or Heß may refer to: 
 Hess (surname), also Heß in German, people with the surname Hess

 Hess, Oklahoma, a community in the United States
 Hess Educational Organization, the largest private provider of English instruction in the Republic of China
 Hess Corporation, an integrated oil and gasoline company (USA)
 H.E.S.S., an experiment in Gamma-ray astronomy
 Hess's law, a law in chemistry
 Hess's, a defunct department store chain based out of Allentown, Pennsylvania
 Carrosserie Hess AG, a commercial vehicle manufacturer in Switzerland
 Hess Catalogue of compositions of Ludwig van Beethoven
 Hess (crater), a lunar impact crater on the far side of the Moon

See also
 Hesse (disambiguation)